Kamak-e Olya (also Romanized as Kamak-e ‘Olyā and Kamak ‘Olyā; also known as Kamak, Kamak-e Bālā, and Kūmak Bāla) is a village in Chaharduli-ye Gharbi Rural District, Chaharduli District, Qorveh County, Kurdistan Province, Iran. At the 2006 census, its population was 685, in 135 families. The village is populated by Kurds.

References 

Towns and villages in Qorveh County
Kurdish settlements in Kurdistan Province